Asia Beauty is a 2015 studio album by Canadian flutist (flautist) and composer Ron Korb. The compositions are the culmination of Korb's experience of 13 years of travelling and performing in Asia.

Asia Beauty was nominated for Best New Age Album at the 58th Grammy Awards.

Background
Asia Beauty is a recipient of FACTOR juried sound recording program and was released through Humbledragon Entertainment. The album consists of 19 tracks with 3 bonus tracks, composed and produced by Korb, and packaged as a 36-page picture story book with CD. The photography, mostly taken by the composer's photographer wife, is all original from the fascinating places Korb has personally visited.

Korb's Asia Beauty is an instrumental album that travels from the sultry cafés of Vietnam in Hanoi Café to ancient palaces in The House of the Five Beauties to the bamboo forests of Taiwan in Blue Bamboo to the spectacular terraces in China in Two Mountains. Dramatic melodies are brought to life by the fascinating sounds of the traditional Chinese instruments: dizi, erhu, pipa, yangqin, guzheng and the 5000 year old guqin. Other rare Chinese woodwinds showcased include bawu (folk clarinet), xun (ceramic vessel flute), and dadi (bass bamboo flute). The album was recorded in Kuhl Music, Canterbury Music, and Glenn Gould Studio (Canadian Broadcasting Centre), and mastered in Lacquer Channel Mastering, Toronto, Canada. Performances by Korb and a cast of Canadian musicians who complement the cast of Toronto Chinese traditional instrumentalists.

Awards
 2016 the 58th Grammy Awards Nomination for Best New Age Album
 2016 International Acoustic Music Awards First Prize Winner for Best Instrumental (track: Two Mountains)
 2016 One World Music Awards First Prize Winner for Best World/Global Fusion Album
 2015 Zone Music Reporter Awards for Best World Album
 2015 The Global Music Awards for Gold Medal - Best of Show
 2015 The Global Music Awards for Best Instrumental Album
 2015 The Global Music Awards for Best Instrumental Performance (track: Blue Bamboo)
 2015 The Global Music Awards for Best Crossover World Music (track: House of the Five Beauties)
 2015 The Global Music Awards for Best Best Album Art/Graphics (design by Caroline Quan)
 2015 International Acoustic Music Awards for Finalist in the open song category (track: Hanoi Cafe)

Track listing
The album consists of 19 tracks, all composed and produced by Ron Korb, with three bonus tracks.

Personnel
 Ron Korb: producer, composer, flute, bass flute, dizi, dadi, Huber flute, bawu, xun, xiao, penny whistle, kalimba, handpan
 Lin Xiaoqiu: erhu
 Liana Berube: violin
 Larry Crowe: drums, percussion
 Bill Evans: piano, accordion
 Susan Greenway: piano
 Lou Pomanti: piano
 Wendy Zhao: pipa
 Zhang Di: yangqin
 Cynthia Qin: guzheng
 Steve Lucas: acoustic bass, bass
 George Koller: acoustic bass
 Aidan Mason: guitar,
 Bill Bridges: guitar
 Lucas Tensen: cello
 Nan Feihong: guqin, guzheng
 Chris Donnelly: spoons
 Jade Hong: guzheng
 Paul Intson: kalimba, guitar, acoustic bass, recording engineer
 Sharlene Wallace: Celtic harp
 Ray Hickey Jr.: guitar guzheng
 Ben Riley: drums
 Donald Quan: piano, tabla
 Laila Biali: Piano
 Rick Shadrach Lazar: Percussion
 Ma Xianghua: erhu
 Yi Qin:pipa
 Wang Long: yangqin
 Ren Jie: guzheng
 Gary Honess: recording engineer
 Ron Searles: recording engineer
 Jeremy Darby: mixing engineer
 Phil Demetro: mastering engineer
 Jade Yeh: photography (additional photo credits: Dan Shao, tOine)
 Carolyn Quan: album design

References

2015 albums
Ron Korb albums
Instrumental albums